Santa Eulalia la Mayor is a locality located in the municipality of Loporzano, in Huesca province, Aragon, Spain. As of 2020, it has a population of 58.

Geography 
Santa Eulalia la Mayor is located 24km northeast of Huesca.

References

Populated places in the Province of Huesca